Józef Wiśniewski (1 November 1940 – 9 January 1996), was a Polish former ice hockey player. He played for TKH Toruń during his career. He also played for the Polish national team at the 1964 Winter Olympics.

References

External links
 

1940 births
1996 deaths
Ice hockey players at the 1964 Winter Olympics
Olympic ice hockey players of Poland
People from Toruń County
Sportspeople from Kuyavian-Pomeranian Voivodeship
Polish ice hockey goaltenders
TKH Toruń players